Rudolph “Speedy” Johnson (born July 10, 1941) is a former American football player who played for San Francisco 49ers and Atlanta Falcons of the National Football League (NFL). He played college football at the University of Nebraska.

References

1941 births
Living people
Players of American football from Houston
American football halfbacks
Nebraska Cornhuskers football players
San Francisco 49ers players
Atlanta Falcons players